Irene Moreno (born November 23, 1952) is an American rower. She competed in the women's quadruple sculls event at the 1976 Summer Olympics.

References

External links
 

1952 births
Living people
American female rowers
Olympic rowers of the United States
Rowers at the 1976 Summer Olympics
People from Huntington Park, California
21st-century American women